Montell Jordan is the fifth studio album by American singer Montell Jordan. It was released by Def Soul on February 26, 2002 in the United States. It was his last album with Def Jam.

Track listing

Charts

References

Montell Jordan albums
2002 albums
Def Jam Recordings albums